Sir Almeric William FitzRoy  (12 November 1851 – 31 May 1935) was a British civil servant.

FitzRoy was the son of Francis Horatio FitzRoy (1823–1900), the grandson of Rear Admiral Lord William FitzRoy and the great-grandson of Augustus FitzRoy, 3rd Duke of Grafton.

He was Clerk of the Privy Council between 9 August 1898 and May 1923.

FitzRoy was invested as a Commander of the Royal Victorian Order (CVO) by King Edward VII at Buckingham Palace on 11 August 1902, and later promoted to a Knight Commander (KCVO) of the Order in 1909.

References

1851 births
1935 deaths
Almeric FitzRoy
British civil servants
Clerks of the Privy Council
Knights Commander of the Order of the Bath
Knights Commander of the Royal Victorian Order